Sir Edmund Denton, 1st Baronet (25 October 1676 – 4 May 1714), of Hillesden, Buckinghamshire, was an English Whig politician who sat in the English and British House of Commons from 1698 to 1713.

Denton was baptized on 25 October 1676, the eldest son of Alexander Denton (1654–1698), M.P. for Buckingham, 1690–1698, and his wife, Esther (or Hester) Herman, daughter of Nicholas Herman of Middleton Stony. He was a member of a Cumberland family which had been granted the manor of Hillesdon by King Edward IV. He matriculated at Wadham College, Oxford in 1695, and was admitted at Middle Temple in 1697. He succeeded his father in 1698. 

Denton was returned as Member of Parliament for Buckingham at the 1698 English general election. 

On 12 May 1699, he was created a baronet, of Hillesdon in the County of Buckingham. He continued to represent Buckingham until the 1708 British general election, when he was returned as MP for Buckinghamshire, a seat he held until 1713.

Denton married, with a dowry of £10,000, Mary Rowe, daughter and co-heiress of Anthony Rowe, of Hackney, Middlesex. The marriage was childless. He died on 4 May 1714, aged 37, when the baronetcy became extinct. 

Lady Denton married as her second husband Trevor Hill, 1st Viscount Hillsborough and died in 1742. Denton was the elder brother of Alexander Denton.

References

1676 births
1714 deaths
Baronets in the Baronetage of England
English MPs 1698–1700
English MPs 1701
English MPs 1701–1702
English MPs 1702–1705
English MPs 1705–1707
Members of the Parliament of Great Britain for English constituencies
British MPs 1708–1710
British MPs 1710–1713